The 1984 European Athletics Indoor Championships were held at Scandinavium in Gothenburg, Sweden on 3 and 4 March 1984. The track used in the stadium at the time was 196 metres long.

Medal summary

Men

Women

Medal table

Participating nations

 (4)
 (4)
 (10)
 (2)
 (22)
 (1)
 (3)
 (7)
 (15)
 (10)
 (3)
 (2)
 (2)
 (22)
 (1)
 (4)
 (12)
 (22)
 (6)
 (15)
 (11)
 (23)
 (5)
 (3)
 (26)
 (5)

See also
1984 in athletics (track and field)

References

 Results - men at GBRathletics.com
 Results - women at GBRathletics.com
 EAA

 
European Athletics Indoor Championships
European Indoor
International athletics competitions hosted by Sweden
European Athletics Indoor Championships
International sports competitions in Gothenburg
European Athletics Indoor Championships
1980s in Gothenburg
Athletics in Gothenburg